The Crown is a pub in Covent Garden, London, at 43 Monmouth Street facing on to Seven Dials and Shorts Gardens.

The pub was established in 1833. The ceramic tiling outside is original.

It was known as The Clock House in the time of Charles Dickens, when it was a "hot bed of villainy", in an area well known for prostitutes and pickpockets.

The pub is part of the Taylor Walker pub chain.

References

External links

Covent Garden
Pubs in the London Borough of Camden